Matthys (Boy) Michael Louw  (21 February 1906 – 3 May 1988), was a rugby union player on the South African rugby team. His primary position was prop but he also played in the line-out for the Springboks at second row, flanker and number eight.

Biography
Louw was born on the farm Watervlei near Wellington as the fifth child of ten brothers and five sisters. One brother died young, he and Fanie Louw became Springboks and the other brothers all played senior rugby.

His Springbok debut was in 1928 against the visiting All Blacks, when he was selected as lock for the fourth test at the Crusaders Ground in Port Elizabeth. Louw played 18 test matches for the Boks, 13 of which as loosehead prop and scored one try. He also played 31 tour matches in which he scored five tries.

Test history

See also
List of South Africa national rugby union players – Springbok no. 207

References

South African rugby union players
South Africa international rugby union players
People from Wellington, Western Cape
1906 births
1988 deaths
South African military personnel of World War II
South African Army personnel
Rugby union props
Western Province (rugby union) players
Rugby union players from the Western Cape